Braian Nicolás Ruíz (born 5 February 1998) is an Argentine professional footballer who plays as a defender for Tigre.

Career
Ruíz started in the system of Tigre. After being an unused substitute for a Primera División fixture in both the 2017–18 and 2018–19 seasons, versus Huracán and Godoy Cruz, Ruíz made his senior bow in the Copa Argentina on 28 February 2019 during a loss to Primera B Metropolitana's Estudiantes at the Estadio Julio Humberto Grondona. Ruíz spent the 2019–20 campaign out on loan in the third tier with Fénix.

Career statistics
.

References

External links

1998 births
Living people
Place of birth missing (living people)
Argentine footballers
Association football defenders
Primera B Metropolitana players
Club Atlético Tigre footballers
Club Atlético Fénix players